Hans Skopovny (Johan) (born around 1525) - tiun (ruler) of Samogitia (Land of Zhemaitiya) in 1567.

Biography 
Hans was the son of Stanislav Skop (Skopov) and Princess Helena Andreevna Sangushko (1494-1561). Stanislav Skop - was in 1527-1529 a Royal secretary and  Skerstomon and Tendziagilski (Samogitia land, Taurage County) derzhavtsa (tiun, ruler). Stanislav Skop was the grandson of Skop (died before 1500) from the old princely dynasty of Dovsprungs. 

For Princess Helena Andreevna Sangushko this was the second marriage. Her first husband was Prince Peter Timofeevich Massalsky. The parents of Princess Helena Andreevna were Prince Andrei Alexandrovich Sangushko (1454-1534), CoA Pogon and Princess Ksenia-Maria Ivanovna Ostrozhskaya (b. 1458). 

The daughter of Hans was Anna Skopovna, who together with her husband Boleslaw Dubikowski (CoA Ostoja), was a Smolensk's Deputy Cup-bearers in the early to mid 1600s.They owned estates near Smolensk: Poretskoye, Stankovo, Korenkovo and Folvark Kovalev.

Footnotes 

Lithuanian noble families
Ruthenian noble families
Ruthenian nobility of the Polish–Lithuanian Commonwealth